NGC 3576 is a bright emission nebula in the Sagittarius arm of the galaxy a few thousand light-years away from the Eta Carinae nebula. It is also approximately 100 light years across and 9000 light-years away from Earth. It was discovered by John Frederick William Herschel on 16 March 1834. This nebula has received six different classification numbers. Currently, astronomers call the entire nebula NGC 3576. A popular nickname is "The Statue of Liberty Nebula" because of the distinctive shape in the middle of the nebula. The name was first suggested in 2009 by Dr. Steve Mazlin, a member of Star Shadows Remote Observatory (SSRO). Within the nebula, episodes of star formation are thought to contribute to the complex and suggestive shapes. Powerful winds from the nebula's embedded, young, massive stars shape the looping filaments.

References

External links

Photo of the "Statue of Liberty"

Carina–Sagittarius Arm
3576
Emission nebulae
Carina (constellation)
Star-forming regions